KPVT-LD is a low-power digital television station in Las Vegas, Nevada. It is owned by DNV Spectrum Holdings, Inc.  It currently airs six sub-channels.

The current transmitter is on Mt. Potosi on ATSC Ch. 27, virtual Ch. 2 and owned by DNV SPECTRUM HOLDINGS, LLC.

Subchannels

References

External links

2004 establishments in Nevada
Pahrump, Nevada
Television channels and stations established in 2004
PVT-LD